Gurmel Singh Dhillon was an Indian songwriter and lyricist of Panjabi music. As was the trend then, he wrote mostly duets. While many of the then well-known Punjabi singers sang his songs, the Muhammad Sadiq-Ranjit Kaur duo sung the most number of his songs.

Early life
Gurmail Singh Dhillon belonged to a village Bhukhianwali (now Bhagwangarh) of Bathinda district of Punjab, India and was a bank employee. After his death, his wife and daughter still live in the village.

Songs
Aakhri Tarik Mere Yaar Di
Do Aar Dian Do Paar Dian
Miloon Pehr De Tarke
Aai Lukdi Lukaundi
Sun Ke Lalkaara Tera
Ho Gai Dabbi Meri Khali
Ajj Ton Nahi Peeni Daru

See also 
 Babu Singh Maan
 Dev Tharike Wala
 Didar Sandhu
 Muhammad Sadiq
 Ranjit Kaur

References

Indian lyricists
Indian male songwriters
Punjabi-language lyricists
Punjabi-language songwriters